The Laestadian Lutheran Church (LLC) is a religious Christian movement, its teachings based on the Bible and the Lutheran Confessions.  From June 9, 1973, the organisation was named the Association of American Laestadian Congregations (AALC), before the association changed its name in 1994 in order better to convey its spiritual heritage. , the Laestadian Lutheran Church has 33 member congregations in the United States and Canada, with highest concentrations of members in Minnesota, Washington, Arizona, Michigan in the United States and in Saskatchewan, Canada; the congregations are served by about 90 ministers, nearly all of them lay preachers.

In Northern Europe, the association's sister organizations are the Conservative Laestadians' Central Association of the Finnish Associations of Peace in Finland, the Sveriges fridsföreningarnas centralorganisation in Sweden, and the Estonian Lutheran Association of Peace.

The main teaching among them is of Jesus' suffering, death, and resurrection. The work of Jesus Christ continues in this world as the work of the Holy Spirit. The Laestadian Lutheran Church teaches of God's kingdom and the need for repentance and the forgiveness of sins. The church holds, in accord with the Lutheran Confessions, that the Bible is the highest guide and authority for Christian faith, doctrine, and life. The norms in the congregation such as refraining from birth-control, make-up, and dancing, are some of the things members do not feel are right to do as a child of God.

The Laestadian Lutheran Church takes its name from Martin Luther and Lars Levi Laestadius.  Laestadius was a Lutheran pastor who served in northern Sweden from 1825 to 1861. The movement reached North America with Finnish immigrants in the 1860s. Congregations were first formally organized in Cokato, Minnesota, in 1872 and Calumet, Michigan, in 1873. The Laestadian movement in North America has suffered a number of schisms since 1890. The subjects of disagreement have mainly been the understanding of justification, God's congregation, and the sacraments. The last division occurred in 1973 and resulted in the establishment of the Laestadian Lutheran Church.

See also 
Conservative Laestadianism
Laestadianism
Laestadianism in America
Summer services

References

External links 
Laestadian Lutheran Church Home page
LLC Member Congregations
Who We Are
SRK in Finland

Evangelical denominations in North America
Laestadianism
Lutheran denominations in North America
Christian organizations established in 1973
Lutheran denominations established in the 20th century